The 2003 Dutch Figure Skating Championships took place between 10 and 12 January 2003 in Amsterdam. Skaters competed in the disciplines of men's singles, ladies' singles, and ice dancing.

Senior results

Men

Ladies

Ice dancing

External links
 results

Dutch Figure Skating Championships
Dutch Figure Skating Championships, 2003
2003 in Dutch sport